Coptodisca ribesella is a moth of the family Heliozelidae. It was described by Annette Frances Braun in 1925. It is found in the US state of California.

References

Moths described in 1925
Heliozelidae